Korbel Champagne Cellars is a winery based in Guerneville, California. Since 1882, Korbel has primarily manufactured California champagne, using the méthode champenoise process. In this process, sparkling wine is fermented inside the same bottle from which it is served. The company is a division of F. Korbel Brothers, Inc., and also makes brandy and still wine, and imports Prosecco from Italy.

F. Korbel & Bros. is a private company owned and operated by the Heck family. Brown-Forman has handled Korbel's marketing and sales since 1965.

History

Korbel was founded in 1882 by three Czechoslovak brothers named Korbel.  It was purchased by Adolf Heck in 1954. Heck's son, Gary, took over in 1982, and over time increased production from 150,000 to 1.6 million cases per year, making Korbel the 16th largest wine producer in the United States as of 2022.

Use of "champagne" on labels

Korbel has been a producer of fine California méthode champenoise champagnes for 140 years". Korbel has scrupulously followed regulations – both in letter and in spirit - regarding use of the word “champagne” on wines made in and marketed in the United States, regulations established by the U.S. Department of Treasury in the 1930s. These regulations allow U.S. producers to use names of geographical significance that also designate a class or type of wine. Such names – like champagne, sherry and port - are called semi-generics, and may be used on labels only in direct conjunction with an appropriate appellation of origin (place in the United States where the grapes were grown) and only on wines that conform to the standard of identity for that class or type.  In 2006, all 27 EU-member countries, including France, signed the Bilateral U.S.-EC Trade Agreement on Wine reaffirming this right.  This Agreement takes the laws of all involved nations into account, halts the development and use of new brands with semi-generic terms by U.S. wineries, while protecting U.S. producers – such as Korbel – who have made substantial long term investments in trademarks, brand names and marketing of their products.

Popularity
Korbel California champagnes have been served at 10 United States presidential inaugurations. It was also one of the wines served on January 20, 2009, at the Congressional Inaugural Luncheon for U.S. President Barack Obama.

Korbel's brandy has a particularly strong following in the State of Wisconsin, where over 50% of Korbel's brandy production is consumed.

References

External links

 – official site

Wineries in Sonoma County
Brown–Forman brands
Sparkling wines